Bridget Joanna Turner (22 February 1939 – 27 December 2014) was an English actress.

She played a radical English teacher, Judy Threadgold, opposite Alun Armstrong's woodwork teacher in Alan Plater's Get Lost! for Yorkshire Television, shown in 1981. Armstrong was unavailable for a sequel, so it was completely recast and became The Beiderbecke Affair with the parts going to Barbara Flynn and James Bolam. She played Phyllis in Alan Ayckbourn's TV film Season's Greetings (play).

On 8 May 2009, John Cleese stated in an interview that Turner was the original choice in 1974 for the role of Sybil Fawlty in Fawlty Towers. She turned it down and the part was given to Prunella Scales.

Turner died on 27 December 2014 in Dorchester, Dorset, at the age of 75, and was survived by her husband, Frank Cox. She was also godmother to actor Tom Burke.

Filmography
The Walking Stick (1970) – Sarah Dainton
To Catch a Spy (1971) – Woman in Plane
Under Milk Wood (1972) – Cherry Owen
Runners (1983) – The School – Teacher
Season's Greetings (play) (1986 TV Film) – Phyllis
Remember Me? (1997) – Elderly sister
The Gathering (2003) – Mrs Groves

References

External links

Bridget Turner profile, filmreference.com. Retrieved 14 January 2016. 

1939 births
2014 deaths
English stage actresses
English television actresses
People from Cleethorpes
Actresses from Lincolnshire
Alumni of RADA
20th-century British businesspeople